Wolimierz  is a village in the administrative district of Gmina Leśna, within Lubań County, Lower Silesian Voivodeship, in south-western Poland, both near the German and near the Czech borders. The nearest towns are Mirsk and Swieradow Zdroj. Prior to 1945 it was in Germany.

The village has an approximate population of 317.

The area has traditional houses (umgebindehaus) and Catholic churches in which German influence can be devised.
Wolimierz and the nearby villages like Pobiedna are also known as places for ecological tourism, encouraged by the good conditions of the road infrastructure.

The cultural life in the area has been promoted lately by the Stacja Wolimierz gallery and theatre, located in a deserted train station of Wolimierz. There are several international festivals and workshops that are held there each year.

References

Villages in Lubań County